Off (stylized as OFF) is a French-language role-playing video game released in 2008 by the Belgian team Unproductive Fun Time, consisting of Martin Georis ("Mortis Ghost") and Alias Conrad Coldwood. It has garnered a cult following for its story, characters and atmosphere, particularly after its officially sanctioned fan translation into English in 2011. It is about an enigmatic humanoid entity known as the Batter, who is described as being on a "sacred mission" to "purify" the world of Off. The Batter travels through four bizarre Zones in the world, revealing more about the world as the game goes on.

Gameplay 

The gameplay of Off is similar to that of classic RPGs. The Batter advances by leveling up, acquiring new party members, and upgrading his statistics, such as attack and defense, as well as gaining special abilities termed "competences." Unlike similar games that function in a turn based system, OFF uses a system in which a character is able to attack once a cooldown has passed, meaning enemies and players are able to attack each other at the same time. This system serves to encourage players to make fast decisions in combat. The player can allow combat to take place automatically by selecting the "Auto" option during encounters, which will make the Batter and his Add-Ons act without player input. The battle system also features an unorthodox element system, where rather than "classic" elements often found in RPGs, such as fire or ice, Off uses bizarre elements more commonly thought of as materials: smoke, metal, plastic, meat, and sugar.

There are four numbered Zones, labeled 0–3, along with a fifth zone, The Room, in which the final act of the game takes place. The Zones are only accessible once the player obtains their associated "Zodiac-Cards," which are acquired from the previous Zone's Guardian upon death, and the player traverses between them via a map termed the "nothingness."

One notable feature of Off is its unusual number of puzzles, which include finding a multi-digit password and entering it into a giant keypad, locating missing book pages, or  "repeating room" puzzles where players walk through multiple instances of the same room in the right order to escape.

Plot 

The player (who is referred to directly) assumes control of the Batter, a man in a baseball uniform on a "sacred mission" to "purify the world". After receiving guidance from a talking cat called the Judge, the Batter begins to make his way through four Zones, killing malevolent ghost-like creatures called "spectres" and the Guardian of each Zone in order to "purify" the Zone. After the purification of each Zone, scenes of a sick boy named Hugo are shown, implying a form of connection to the Zone. Along the way the Batter is met by Zacharie, a merchant who sells the Batter items and leaves cryptic hints.

As the Batter progresses in his quest, it is ultimately revealed that the Zones are tied to the Guardians' life force and that killing the Guardians will annihilate all life in the Zones. 

The Batter kills all of the Guardians, thus causing all life to be destroyed, although this isn't his mission. His mission is to kill the spectres only, although he seems to think that any form of hostility makes you a spectre. As all of the guardians showed a form of hostility, the Batter killed them. He doubles down on this even when figuring out what this does, valuing the destruction of the so-called "spectres" over the world.

The first Zone, Zone 1, is a series of towns ruled by a rude and demeaning humanoid creature named Dedan. The second, Zone 2, is a city overseen by the phoenix Japhet, who, desperate to get the attention of the Elsen residents, has possessed the body of the Judge's brother, Valerie. The third and final Zone, Zone 3, is a giant sugar factory, directed by an massively obese man named Enoch.

The Batter eventually reaches an area called the Room. After a series of flashbacks which reveal some details about the Guardians and the nature of the Zone, the Batter faces the Queen, ruler of all the Zones. She admonishes him for the destruction he has caused and attacks him, but is defeated.

After killing the Queen, the Batter finds and kills Hugo, the child who brought him and the Queen into existence. The Batter then comes across a switch, but is confronted by the Judge before he can flip it. The Judge berates both the Batter and the player for deceiving him and destroying the Zones and asks the player to help him to defeat the Batter.

In the Official Ending, the player sides with the Batter and kills the Judge, allowing the Batter to flip the switch. Doing so displays, "The switch is now OFF," as the world fades to black.

In the Special Ending, the player sides with the Judge and defeats the Batter to stop his crusade. The Judge remarks that "Nothing remains now except for our regrets" but prefers this outcome to the Batter completing his mission. During the Special Ending's credits, the Judge is seen walking alone through the purified Zones.

A third Secret Ending can be accessed if the player collects the Aries-Card and plays through either of the normal endings. This joke ending revolves around so-called "Space Apes" in a war against brain-like aliens. The Space Apes describe their plan to construct factories in the now-lifeless world of Off to produce robots capable of killing the aliens.

Development 

Georis lists Killer7, Final Fantasy, and Myst as inspirations for Off. Off has been compared to the Mother series, though Georis has stated that the resemblance is coincidental.

Reception 
Off has been praised for its story, characters, and atmosphere. Heidi Kemps of PC Gamer described it as "a memorable and haunting RPG, filled with tricky puzzles, bizarre symbolism, and challenging thematic elements." Adam Smith of Rock, Paper, Shotgun compared it to Space Funeral.

A large fanbase for the game developed on Tumblr; Off became the sixth most reblogged game of 2013, with the first five being AAA games. Toby Fox mentions Off as a source of inspiration for Undertale numerous times in the Undertale art book.

In 2014 a fangame, Home, was released.

References

External links 
 
 RPG Maker website page

2008 video games
Freeware games
Indie video games
MacOS games
Metafictional video games
Role-playing video games
RPG Maker games
Single-player video games
Surrealist video games
Video games about ghosts
Video games developed in Belgium
Video games with alternate endings
Windows games